Patricio Hacbang Alo (2 December 1939 – 13 April 2021) was a Filipino Catholic bishop.

Alo was born in the Philippines and was ordained to the priesthood in 1964. He served as auxiliary bishop of the Archdiocese of Davao, Philippines from 1981 to 1984 and was bishop of the Diocese of Mati from 1984 to 2014.

Notes

1939 births
2021 deaths
20th-century Roman Catholic bishops in the Philippines
21st-century Roman Catholic bishops in the Philippines